Joseph Anthony Vitale (born April 2, 1949) is an American singer, songwriter, and multi-instrumentalist. In a career spanning more than 55 years, Vitale has played with many of the top names in music during a career dating back to the 1970s.

Vitale pursued a solo career and released his debut album Roller Coaster Weekend in 1974. Since then, he has released two studio albums. His only single to chart is "Lady on the Rock".

Early life
Of Italian heritage, Joseph Anthony Vitale was born on April 2, 1949, in Canton, Ohio. He started playing the drums at an early age, as his father was a barber, and would trade haircuts for drum lessons. The Vitales moved to Florida for a short time, where Joe played in a youth orchestra, but they soon moved back to Ohio.

In high school Vitale played for a while with a band called the Knights. He formed a polka band with his brother and father called the Tony Vitale Trio, with his father on accordion and his brother on bass, but the band was short-lived and didn't make any studio or live recordings. In 1965 the polka band and a rock band called the Echoes were both playing at the Magnolia Homecoming. The Echoes' drummer didn't attend the gig, so Vitale played drums for them. As a result, he joined the Echoes as their regular drummer.

Career

Beginnings
Vitale started his professional music career with the Echoes, who signed with Warner and became the Chylds (1964–68). He gained valuable experience with the band and sang vocals on their single "I Want More (Lovin')." He eventually enrolled at Kent State University and was attending during the May 4, 1970, shootings. Vitale also played with Marble Cake, a band out of Kent Ohio, from 1968–1970. His first national break came when Ted Nugent hired him to play drums in the Amboy Dukes in 1971.

Joe Walsh 
That fall Vitale was invited by his former Kent State classmate Joe Walsh to join Barnstorm, a new band being formed by Walsh in Colorado. The band recorded two albums together and Vitale and Walsh began a longtime partnership (incl. co-writing "Rocky Mountain Way"), although Barnstorm broke up in 1974.

After the breakup, Vitale was (temporarily) the original drummer for the Michael Stanley Band (before Tommy Dobeck), and he recorded his first solo album, 1974's Roller Coaster Weekend, produced by Ron & Howard Albert, with guitar solos contributed by Walsh, Rick Derringer and Phil Keaggy. He then joined the Stills-Young Band for the Long May You Run sessions. Later, Vitale became part of the Crosby, Stills & Nash touring and recording band, beginning with the CSN album and continuing until 2009. He has also co-produced and contributed songs to Crosby, Stills & Nash as well as to solo efforts by Stephen Stills and Graham Nash.

Association with the Eagles
In 1975 Vitale's partner Walsh joined the Eagles and Vitale became part of the Eagles' touring band playing drums, keyboards, and singing backing vocals. The Walsh/Vitale song "Pretty Maids All in a Row" appears on the Eagles' album Hotel California (1976). He is also credited on The Long Run (1979) and the band's concert recording Eagles Live (1980). For Vitale's second solo album, Plantation Harbor, produced by Bill Szymczyk and also recorded in 1981, Don Felder appeared along with Walsh on guitars, and Stephen Stills co-wrote one of the songs. He continued to appear on Walsh solo albums in the early 1990s.

Among the artists with whom Vitale has appeared are Outlaws (Hurry Sundown, 1977), Dan Fogelberg (Windows and Walls, 1984), Peter Frampton, John Entwistle (Too Late the Hero, 1981) and Zakk Wylde (Book of Shadows, 1996).

In 2008 Vitale released Speaking in Drums. The album is a collection of eleven songs written and performed by Joe, his wife Susie and his son Joe Jr., among other guests. In 2008 he also released Backstage Pass, an autobiography written by his wife.

In 2012, Joe Vitale appeared on the album The Healing Song with self help singer/songwriter Joseph Vitale (same name, different artist). Included on the recording are fellow musicians Glenn Fukunaga on bass (Robert Plant), Daniel Barrett on guitar (Porterdavis) and Grammy-winning artist David Darling performing on cello.

Vitale also wrote or co-wrote many songs with Joe Walsh.

Personal life
Vitale married his wife Susie in 1974. She is a graduate of Kent State University and conducted post graduate studies at Malone University and the University of Akron. She has served as president of the Community Television Consortium in Canton and as host of the TV program What's Happening in Stark County. They have a son, Joe Vitale, Jr.

Discography
 Roller Coaster Weekend (1974)
 Plantation Harbor (1981)
 Speaking in Drums (2008)

Session musician work
With David Crosby
 Oh Yes I Can (A&M Records, 1989)

With Crosby, Stills & Nash
 CSN (Atlantic Records, 1977)
 Daylight Again (Atlantic Records, 1982)
 Allies (Atlantic Records, 1983)
 American Dream (Atlantic Records, 1988)
 Live It Up (Atlantic Records, 1990)
 Looking Forward (Reprise Records, 1999)

With John Entwistle
 Too Late the Hero (Atco Records, 1981)

With Don Felder
 Airborne (Asylum Records, 1983)

With Dan Fogelberg
 Nether Lands (Epic Records, 1977)
 Windows and Walls (Epic Records, 1984)

With Al Kooper
 Championship Wrestling (Columbia Records, 1982)

With Graham Nash
 Earth & Sky (Capitol Records, 1980)

With Boz Scaggs
 Middle Man (Columbia Records, 1980)
With Stephen Stills
 Illegal Stills (Columbia Records, 1976)
 Thoroughfare Gap (Columbia Records, 1978)
 Right by You (Atlantic Records, 1984)
 Man Alive! (Pryamid Records, 2005)

With Mickey Thomas
 Alive Alone (Elektra Records, 1981)

With Joe Walsh
 Barnstorm (ABC Records, 1972)
 The Smoker You Drink, the Player You Get (ABC Records, 1973)
 So What (ABC Records, 1974)
 But Seriously, Folks... (Asylum Records, 1978)
 There Goes the Neighborhood (Asylum Records, 1981)
 You Bought It – You Name It (Warner Bros. Records, 1983)
 Ordinary Average Guy (Epic Records, 1991)
 Songs for a Dying Planet (Epic Records, 1992)
 Analog Man (Fantasy Records, 2012)

With Bill Wyman
 Stone Alone (Atlantic Records, 1976)

References

External links

The Chylds – I Want More (Lovin') from YouTube

1949 births
Living people
American rock drummers
American session musicians
American percussionists
American people of Italian descent
American male singer-songwriters
American rock songwriters
American rock singers
20th-century American singers
American rock bass guitarists
American multi-instrumentalists
Blues rock musicians
Musicians from Canton, Ohio
Kent State University alumni
Singer-songwriters from Ohio
Asylum Records artists
Atlantic Records artists
ABC Records artists
20th-century American bass guitarists
20th-century American drummers
American male drummers
Guitarists from Ohio
American male bass guitarists
Conga players
Timbaleros
Tambourine players
American rock pianists
American male pianists
American organists
American male organists
American rock keyboardists
American flautists
20th-century American pianists
21st-century American pianists
21st-century American keyboardists
21st-century organists
Barnstorm (band) members
20th-century American male singers
21st-century American male musicians
20th-century American keyboardists
20th-century flautists
21st-century flautists